Singaraja Zona Fair Play Football Club (simply known as Singaraja ZFP) is an Indonesian football club located in Singaraja, Buleleng, Bali. The team competes in Liga 3, the lowest tier of the Indonesian football league system.

Honours
 Liga 3 Bali
 Runner-up: 2022

References

External links
 

Football clubs in Indonesia
Football clubs in Bali
Association football clubs established in 2022
2022 establishments in Indonesia